José Santos Valdés Martinez (born August 1, 1997, in Saltillo, Mexico) is a Mexican sport shooter. He won the silver medal in the 2014 Summer Youth Olympics in the 10 meters Air Rifle 10m Air Rifle Mixed International Teams (Mixed-NOC) event.

Career
Valdés participated in the 2014 ISSF World Cup, held at Fort Benning, where he claimed the 2nd place in the 10m Air Rifle Men Youth event. He scored 199.3 points.

He won a quota to participate in the 2014 Summer Youth Olympics after ending second in an American Continental YOG Qualification competition (2014 ISSF World Cup). There he claimed the precious silver medal in the 10m Air Rifle Mixed International Teams (Mixed-NOC) event, which he partnered with Fernanda Russo from Argentina.

References

External links 
José Santos Valdés Profile at ISSF

1997 births
Living people
Mexican male sport shooters
Shooters at the 2014 Summer Youth Olympics
Sportspeople from Saltillo
21st-century Mexican people